Yasca is an open source program which looks for security vulnerabilities, code-quality, performance, and conformance to best practices in program source code. It leverages external open source programs, such as FindBugs, PMD, JLint, JavaScript Lint, PHPLint, Cppcheck, ClamAV, Pixy, and RATS to scan specific file types, and also contains many custom scanners developed for Yasca. It is a command-line tool that generates reports in HTML, CSV, XML, MySQL, SQLite, and other formats. It is listed as an inactive project at the well-known OWASP security project, and also in a government software security tools review at the U.S Department of Homeland Security web site.

Languages Scanned

Yasca has at least one scanner for each of the following file types:
.NET (VB.NET, C#, ASP.NET)
ASP
C/C++
COBOL
ColdFusion
CSS
HTML
Java
JavaScript
Perl
PHP
Python
Raw HTTP Traffic
Visual Basic

Yasca 2.2

Version 2.2 was released in June 2010 and included a large number of minor updates over version 2.1, most notably, natively compiled plugins on Linux, reducing the need to use Wine. Version 2.2 contains some experimental modules, including a TCP packet logger and a rule to scan those logs for sensitive information. Additional rules for this are expected in the next update.

As with prior 2.x releases, Yasca comes packaged as a core bundle, plus separately downloadable plugins. No plugins are required, but best results occur when using all of the necessary plugins.

References

External links

Static program analysis tools
Software using the BSD license